The 1902 United States elections elected the 58th United States Congress, and occurred in the middle of Republican President Theodore Roosevelt's first term, during the Fourth Party System. Roosevelt had become president on September 14, 1901, upon the assassination of his predecessor, William McKinley. Republicans retained a majority in both chambers of Congress, while the Populist Party and Silver Republican Party disappeared from Congress.

Reapportionment added twenty nine seats to the House. Democrats picked up several seats in the newly enlarged House, while Republicans made lesser gains. Republicans continued to control the chamber with a slightly diminished majority.

In the Senate, Republicans and Democrats each picked up one seat, while the Populist Party lost both its seats. Republicans maintained a commanding majority in the chamber.

See also
1902 United States House of Representatives elections
1902–03 United States Senate elections
1902 United States gubernatorial elections

References

Primary sources
  1902 Annual Cyclopedia (1903) online; highly detailed coverage of "Political, Military, and Ecclesiastical Affairs; Public Documents; Biography, Statistics, Commerce, Finance, Literature, Science, Agriculture, and Mechanical Industry" for 1902; massive compilation of facts and primary documents; worldwide coverage; 865pp
 Colby, Frank Moore ed. The International Yearbook A Compendium Of The Worlds Progress During The Year 1902 (1903) coverage of each state online
 Democratic Campaign Book, Congressional Election 1902 ... online used by Democrats for facts and arguments during the campaign

1902 elections in the United States
1902
United States midterm elections